Michael A Ralph (born 4 July 1938) is a retired British athlete. He competed in the men's triple jump at the 1964 Summer Olympics.

He also represented England in the triple jump at the 1958 British Empire and Commonwealth Games in Cardiff, Wales.

References

1938 births
Living people
Athletes (track and field) at the 1964 Summer Olympics
British male triple jumpers
Olympic athletes of Great Britain
Place of birth missing (living people)
Athletes (track and field) at the 1958 British Empire and Commonwealth Games
Commonwealth Games competitors for England